The 2005 JR  occurred in Amagasaki, Hyōgo Prefecture, Japan, on 25 April 2005 at 09:19 local time (00:19 UTC), just after the local rush hour. It occurred when a seven-car commuter train came off the tracks on West Japan Railway Company's (JR West) Fukuchiyama Line in just before  on its way for Dōshisha-mae via the JR Tōzai Line and the Gakkentoshi Line, and the front two cars rammed into an apartment building. The first car slid into the first-floor parking garage and as a result took days to remove, while the second slammed into the corner of the building, being crushed into an L-shaped against it by the weight of the remaining cars. Of the roughly 700 passengers (initial estimate was 580 passengers) on board at the time of the crash, 106 passengers, in addition to the driver,  were killed and 562 others injured. Most survivors and witnesses claimed that the train appeared to have been travelling too fast. The incident was Japan's most serious since the 1963 Tsurumi rail accident.

Train details and crash

It was a seven-car 207 series electric multiple unit (EMU) formation consisting of a four-car set and a three-car set coupled together as shown below, with Car 1 leading. The train was carrying approximately 700 passengers at the time of the accident.

The front four cars derailed completely, with the first car ramming into the parking lot of the apartment building and the second car colliding into the external wall of the building becoming almost completely compacted by the third and fourth cars, which were themselves pushed from the rear by the fifth car.

Investigation

Investigators primarily focused on the speeding by the 23-year-old driver, later identified as Ryūjirō Takami (who was among the dead), as being the most likely cause of the derailment. Twenty-five minutes before the derailment, the driver had run a red signal, causing the automatic train stop (ATS) to bring the train to a halt. The train had also overshot the correct stopping position at an earlier stop at Itami Station with more than 3 carriages, requiring him to back up the train, and resulting in a 90-second delay, about four minutes before the disaster. By the time the train passed Tsukaguchi Station at a speed of 120 km/h, the delay had been reduced to 60 seconds.

Investigators speculate that the driver may have been trying to make up this lost time by increasing the train's speed beyond customary limits. Many reports from surviving passengers indicate that the train was traveling at a faster than normal speed. Furthermore, it is speculated that the driver may have felt stressed because he would have been punished for the two infractions. Ten months before the crash, the driver had been reprimanded by the train's operator, the West Japan Railway Company (JR West), for overshooting a station platform by 100 meters. In the minutes leading up to the derailment, he may have been thinking of the punishment he would have faced and may have not been totally focused on driving.

JR West is very strict when it comes to punctuality, and commuters often depend on near-perfect timing on the part of trains to commute to and from work on time. This is because at JR West stations (including the derailed train's next scheduled stop at Amagasaki Station) trains meet on both sides of the same platform to allow people to transfer between rapid and local trains running on the same line. As a result, a small delay in one train can significantly cascade through the timetable for the rest of the day due to the tightness of the schedule. Immediately after the crash occurred, some of the mass media pointed to the congested schedule of the Fukuchiyama Line as an indirect factor. In fact, cumulative changes over the previous three years had reduced the leeway in the train's schedule from 71 to 28 seconds over the fifteen minutes between Takarazuka and Amagasaki stations.

The final report officially concluded that the retraining system was one probable cause of the crash. This program consisted of severe verbal abuse, forcing the employees to repent by writing extensive reports. Also during these times, drivers were forced to perform minor tasks, particularly involving cleaning, instead of their normal jobs. Many experts saw the process of nikkin kyoiku as a punishment and psychological torture, not retraining. The driver had also received a non-essential phone call from the general control station at the time he was rounding the bend.

It has been speculated that the driver was so stressed about the inevitability of going back to nikkin kyoiku due to the prior infractions from that morning that he did not notice that the train was going too fast. When the driver did notice it, four seconds before the derailment, he used the service brake instead of the emergency brake, presumably to avoid another infraction, since the use of the emergency brake had to be justified.

Japanese building codes do not regulate the distance between train lines and residential buildings due to high confidence in the engineering of the rail system. As a result, railway lines often pass close to residential buildings in metropolitan areas.

Aftermath 
Amongst other things, the Ministry of Land and Transportation asked all railway companies to update their automatic stopping systems so that trains brake automatically to slow down as they approach sharp curves.

It is believed that a contributing factor in the accident was the JR West policy of schedule punctuality. As a result of this, Masataka Ide, a JR West adviser who played a major role in enforcing the punctuality of the company's trains, announced that he would resign in June 2005 at the company's annual shareholder meeting, with the company's chairman and president resigning in August.

The section where the crash occurred, between Amagasaki and Takarazuka stations, was re-opened for service on 19 June 2005.

According to the investigations carried out by the Hyōgo Prefecture police, out of the 107 deaths, at least 43 (27 men, 16 women), including the driver, were in the first car, at least 45 (22 men, 23 women) were in the second car, and at least one was in the third car. This information was determined by questioning 519 of the approximately 550 injured passengers.

On 26 December 2005, Takeshi Kakiuchi officially resigned from the presidency of JR West in a move intended to take responsibility for the accident. Kakiuchi's successor was Masao Yamazaki, who had previously served as the railway's vice president, based in Osaka. While Kakiuchi's resignation came a day after another serious accident on JR East, officials at the railway did not make any explicit connection between the recent accident and the resignation.

A 2008 The Daily Yomiuri article stated that survivors of the disaster still faced physical and mental health issues.

On 8 July 2009, West Japan Railway Co. President Masao Yamazaki was charged with negligence. On the same day, he announced at a press briefing in Osaka that he would resign, "so the company can operate normally."

On 11 January 2012, Yamazaki was found not guilty of professional negligence by judge Makoto Okada of the Kobe District Court, saying the accident was not sufficiently predictable to merit a finding of guilt.  The court, however, criticized JR West for faulty risk assessment of the curve where the accident happened.

The building hit by the train was demolished in 2017. As of April 2019, a memorial had been built on the site, with only one corner of the building left standing.

As of 2023, the report for this incident still takes a prominent place on West JR's homepage. The text reads "We will never forget the Amagasaki rail crash we caused on 25 April 2005".

Similar accidents

Too fast around sharp curve 
 United Kingdom 1906 Salisbury rail crash, 1906: 28 killed
 United States Malbone Street Wreck, 1918 in New York: 98 killed
 United States Red Arrow crash, 1947 in Pennsylvania: 24 killed
 Australia Camp Mountain train disaster, 1947: 16 killed
 Japan Hachikō Line derailment, February 1947: 184 killed: the worst railway accident to occur in Japan
 United Kingdom Sutton Coldfield train disaster, 1955: 17 killed
 United Kingdom Morpeth rail crashes, 1969, 1984, 1994: a total of 6 killed in three separate accidents
 United Kingdom Eltham Well Hall rail crash, 1972: 6 killed
 United States Cajon Pass, 1989, 1996: 8 killed (6 in 1989 and 2 in 1996)
 Italy Piacenza derailment, 1997: 8 killed
 Germany Brühl train disaster, 2000: 9 killed
 Australia Waterfall train disaster, 2003: 7 killed
 Australia Cairns Tilt Train derailment, 2004: 0 killed
 Spain Valencia Metro derailment, 2006: 41 killed
 Spain Santiago de Compostela derailment, 2013: 79 killed
 United States Spuyten Duyvil derailment, 2013: 4 killed
 United States 2015 Philadelphia train derailment: 8 killed
 United States 2017 Washington train derailment: 3 killed
 Taiwan 2018 Yilan train derailment, October 2018: 18 killed

Failure to check speed after stop and proceed 
 Australia Glenbrook train disaster, 1999: 7 killed

See also 
 List of rail disasters

Media 
 Brakeless, a 2014 Peabody Award winning documentary film on the accident by Kyoko Miyake.
 Featured on National Geographic's show: Seconds from Disaster. (S06E05, Runaway train)., Seconds From Disaster

References

External links 
 Aircraft and Railway Accidents Investigation Commission Official report (agency has since merged into the Japan Transport Safety Board)
 Train Derailment Accident between Tsukaguchi and Amagasaki Stations of the Fukuchiyama Line of the West Japan Railway Company (Excerpt) (Archive) - 22 June 2007 - English translation
   - First page
 
 
 
 
 
 
  
  
 
 Seconds to Disaster Documentary (YouTube)

2005 disasters in Japan
Derailments in Japan
Railway accidents in 2005
2005 in Japan
April 2005 events in Japan
Rail accidents caused by a driver's error
Rail transport in Hyōgo Prefecture
Heisei period